Geo News is a Pakistani news channel owned by the Jang Media Group. It was launched in October 2002 as the news and current affairs program was under its flagship channel Geo TV, which later in 2005, Geo TV decided to launch its own news channel.

History
The Geo Television Network started out with the launch of its flagship channel Geo TV in October 2002 but has since launched several other channels which include the following: GEO TV Entertainment, GEO News, GEO Kahani, GEO Super (Sports), and GEO Tez (News, Drama & Comedy).

Controversies

Suspension
Geo news has been criticized for naming Pakistan's military generals and ISI officials. They were banned in June 2014 for their accusation against Inter-Services Intelligence (ISI) agency and its chief Lt Gen Zaheerul Islam for attacking leading journalist Hamid Mir.

Owner's statements 
Geo news came under severe criticism when its owner stated publicly that he is running a business. Imran Aslam, an executive of Geo Network said, "This is an attempt to financially cripple the organization into submission." The news channel owner has also been summoned by the court in the past on the issue of non-payment of employee salaries.

Notable hosts and analyst 

 Sohail Warraich
 Shahzeb Khanzada
 Hamid Mir
 Saleem Safi
 Mazhar Abbas

Programming

Current programming 
 Aik Din Geo Kay Sath with Sohail Warraich
 Aaj Shahzeb Khanzada Kay Sath
 Aapas ki Baat (Mon–Thurs 11:05pm)
 Capital Talk
 Geo Pakistan Morning Show
 Hasna Mana Hai (Fri-Sun 11:05pm)
 Jirga with Saleem Safi
 Naya Pakistan 
 Report Card (talk show)
 SCORE (Mon-Fri 5:30pm)

Former programming 

 1 Say 2
 51%
 Alif (2002)
 Aaj Kamran Khan Kay Saath (2002–2014)
 Bazaar (2002-2012)
 BNN (2011–2015)
 Burka Avenger
 Ghamidi
 Geo Shaan Say (2012-2013)
 Geo Ajooba (2010-2013)
 Geo Dost (2007-2014)
 Geomentary (2007-)
 Geo F.I.R (2005 - 2015)
 Hum Awam (2011–2014)
 Lekin (2011-2018)
 50 Minutes (2002 - 2012)
 Awam Ki Adalaat (2011 - 2013)
 Aik Din Geo Ke Saath (2002)
 Wasu Aur Mein (2012)
 Jawab Deyh (2003 - 2013)
 Newsroom (2014 - 2015)
 Meray Mutabiq with Shahid MasoodMatch Box The Sportsman Show (2016)
 Crisis Cell (2009 - 2012)
 Choraha (2009 - 2012)
 Jugnu (2015 - 2016)
 Foreign Affairs (2002 - 2006)
 Aalim Online (2002 - 2016)                                                                                                                                                                                                                                                                                                                                                                                                                                                                                                                                                                                                                       
 GEO LIFESTYLE (2005 - 2007)                                                                                                                                                                                                                                                                                                                                                                                                                                                                                                                                                                                                                                                                                                                                                                                                                                                                                                                                                                                                                                                                                                                                                  
 Hum Sub Umeed Se Hain (2007 - 2015)                                                                                                                                                                                                                                                       
 Ruff-Ruff, Tweet and Dave

See also 
 List of news channels in Pakistan

References

External links
, Geo Television Network, Homepage

 
Mass media in Pakistan
Urdu-language television channels in the United Kingdom
Television stations in Pakistan
Television stations in Karachi
Television channels and stations established in 2004